The 2021 season will be Brann's sixth season back in Eliteserien since their relegation at the end of the 2014 season.

Players and staff

Current squad

For season transfers, see transfers winter 2020–21 and transfers summer 2021.

Out on loan

First team staff 
As of 16 May 2021
{| cellpadding="0" cellspacing="2"

|Head coach: 
|-
|Assistant coach: Eirik Horneland
|-
|Goalkeeper coach: Dan Riisnes
|-
|Fitness coach: Manuel Pericás Torres
|-
|First team player developer: Helge Haugen
|-
|Physician: Arne Instebø
|-
|Physician: Magnus Myntevik
|-
|Physio: David Tovi
|-
|Physio: Gregor Monsen
|-
|Physio: Tore Eland
|-
|Massage therapist: Bjørn Rune Skråmestø
|-
|Equipment manager: Raymond Sanden

Administrative staff

Competitions

Club Friendlies

Eliteserien

Results summary

Results by round

Results

Table

Matches

May

June

July

August

September

October

November

December

Norwegian Cup

Squad statistics

Appearances and goals

Goal scorers

Clean sheets

Disciplinary record

References

Brann
SK Brann seasons